Randall "Randy" Bartz (born October 7, 1968) is an American short track speed skater who competed in the 1994 Winter Olympics.

He was born in Roseville, Minnesota.

In 1994 he was a member of the American relay team which won the silver medal in the 5000 metre relay competition.

References 
 

1968 births
Living people
American male short track speed skaters
Short track speed skaters at the 1994 Winter Olympics
Olympic silver medalists for the United States in short track speed skating
People from Roseville, Minnesota
Medalists at the 1994 Winter Olympics